= MAOG =

Mitteilungen der Altorientalischen Gesellschaft, often abbreviated MAOG, is a German magazine on the art of the Near East, published in Leipzig. It is often referenced in works related to Near-Eastern art. The magazine was founded in 1925.
